In addition to the three principal islands of New York City—Manhattan Island, Staten Island and part of Long Island—each borough contains several smaller islands. New York City contains about 36 to 42 islands in total.

The Bronx 
 Hunter Island, no longer an island, part of Pelham Bay Park
 Twin Island, no longer an island, part of Pelham Bay Park
 Goose Island, Hutchinson River, part of Pelham Bay Park
 North Brother Island (East River)
 South Brother Island (East River)
 Pelham Islands, historical name for a group of mostly uninhabited islands in western Long Island Sound
 The Blauzes
 Chimney Sweeps Islands
 City Island, only inhabited island in the borough
 Hart Island
 High Island
 Rat Island
 Rikers Island (East River), location of New York City's jail

Brooklyn 
 Canarsie Pol, uninhabited,  island in Jamaica Bay
 Coney Island, no longer an island
 Prospect Park Lake islands, 
 Chaim Baier Music Island
 Duck Island
 Three Islands
 Mau Mau Island (also called White Island), located in Marine Park
 Ruffle Bar (Jamaica Bay)

Manhattan 
 Ellis Island (New York Harbor), shared with New Jersey
 Governors Island (New York Harbor)
 Liberty Island (New York Harbor)
 Mill Rock (East River)
 Randalls, Wards, and Sunken Meadow Island, joined by landfill (East River)
 Roosevelt Island (East River)
 U Thant Island, legally Belmont Island (East River)

Queens 
Hog Island, destroyed
Prince of Wales Island (Jamaica Bay)
 Rulers Bar Hassock, home to Broad Channel (Jamaica Bay)
 Ruffle Bar (Jamaica Bay)
 Subway Island / Winhole Hassock (Jamaica Bay)

Staten Island 
 Isle of Meadows (Arthur Kill)
 Prall's Island (Arthur Kill)
 Shooters Island (Kill van Kull), shared with New Jersey
 Hoffman Island (Lower New York Bay)
 Swinburne Island (Lower New York Bay)

See also 

 List of New York City lists
 List of islands of New York (state)

References 

 
Islands, Smaller
Islands